Henry Wainwright (12 July 1832 – 21 December 1875) was an English murderer.

Wainwright was a brushmaker who murdered his mistress Harriet Louisa Lane in September 1874 and buried her body in a warehouse he owned.  When he was declared bankrupt the next year, he disinterred the body in September 1875 and attempted to rebury it with the assistance of his brother Thomas and another brushmaker, Alfred Stokes.  Stokes was suspicious of the contents of the parcels he had been given to carry, and opened one, revealing human body parts, which he immediately reported to police. Henry and Thomas were tried at the Old Bailey before Sir Alexander Cockburn and found guilty: Henry of murder and Thomas of being an accessory after the fact.  Henry Wainwright was sentenced to death and hanged by William Marwood on 21 December 1875 aged 43.

References

 
 
 
 

English people convicted of murder
1832 births
1875 deaths
Executed English people
19th-century executions by England and Wales
People executed for murder
People convicted of murder by England and Wales
1874 murders in the United Kingdom